Sonya Wilde (born 1937) is an American former actress, best known for her starring role in the 1960 film I Passed for White. She started her career as Maria on Broadway with the original cast of West Side Story.

Career
On Broadway, Wilde was an understudy and replacement in the role of Maria in West Side Story (1957).

Selected filmography
I Passed for White (1960)

Selected television
Bonanza (1960)
Cheyenne (1960)
The Americans (1961)
Gunslinger (1961)
Perry Mason (1961)
Rawhide (1961)
Death Valley Days (1960)

Private life
In 1962, Wilde married the banker Jake Butcher, having met him on New Year's Eve 1961 on a blind date. He later became a politician, before spending seven years in prison for fraud. They had four children.

Following her husband's 1985 20-year jail term for bank fraud (he served seven years), Wilde went to court in 1986 to try to keep the family's $675,000 home in the exclusive Sweetwater Club subdivision just outside Orlando.

References

External links
  
 Trailer for I Passed for White, featuring Sonya Wilde
 

Living people
1939 births
20th-century American actresses
American film actresses
American stage actresses
American television actresses
21st-century American women